Escape is the fifth studio album and second English-language album recorded by Spanish singer and songwriter Enrique Iglesias. It was released by Interscope Records on 30 October 2001.

The album was designed in order to have a broader appeal to audiences worldwide, and Iglesias's visual image was carefully crafted for this era, opting for a sexier and sultrier one. Escape proved to be even more successful than its predecessor, Enrique (1999), having sold 8 million copies worldwide. The album earned him a Brit Award for Best Pop Act nomination in 2003.

Composition
Iglesias either wrote or co-wrote every track on the album, and has said that for many of the tracks on the album he started out simply with titles that he later based the songs on. The first song to use this method was "Don't Turn Off the Lights", which was originally going to be the title of the album and the first single. "Hero", the most popular track from the album, was co-written by Paul Barry and Mark Taylor. Iglesias also stated that he wrote many songs for the album, but picked those he considered to be the best.

Critical reception

The album received generally mixed   reviews.

Commercial performance
Escape debuted at number two on the Billboard 200, his then-highest debut on the chart, selling 267,000 copies in its first week, behind Michael Jackson's Invincible. With "Hero" already at number one on the UK Singles Chart, the album also topped the UK Albums Chart, making Iglesias the only Latin artist to have a number-one album and number-one single on the UK charts simultaneously, as well as the first act of any nationality to do so in five years. Escape was the second-best-selling album of 2002 in the United Kingdom, beaten only by Robbie Williams' Escapology. It was also the best-selling album of 2002 in Australia.

The album also performed well throughout the world, being certified triple-platinum in the United States, quadruple-platinum in the United Kingdom, 5× platinum in Canada and Australia, and platinum in Germany.

Track listing

Notes
 signifies a co-producer
 signifies a vocal producer
 signifies an additional producer

Charts

Weekly charts

Year-end charts

Decade-end charts

Certifications

References

External links

2001 albums
Enrique Iglesias albums
Interscope Records albums
Albums produced by Mark Taylor (music producer)